The Araripe Basin is a rift basin covering about , in Ceará, Piauí and Pernambuco states of northeastern Brazil. It is bounded by the Patos and Pernambuco lineaments, and is situated east of the Parnaíba Basin, southwest of the Rio do Peixe Basin and northwest of the Tucano and Jatobá Basins.

The basin has provided a variety of unique fossils in the Crato and Santana Formations and includes the Araripe Geopark, a member of the UNESCO Global Geoparks since 2006. The pterosaurs Araripesaurus and Araripedactylus (now considered a nomen dubium), crocodylian Araripesuchus, the turtle Araripemys, amphibian Arariphrynus, the fish Araripelepidotes and the insect Araripenymphes were named after the basin. The bituminous shales of the Ipubi Formation in the Araripe Basin have potential for shale gas development.

Basin history 

The tectono-sedimentary evolution of the Araripe Basin, located in the Borborema Geologic Province, encompasses four stages, with five tectonostratigraphic phases:
1) Syneclise phase - Silurian to Devonian - characterized by tectonic quiescence in the Borborema Province. It is represented by the deposits of the Cariri Formation, that include medium to coarse-grained quartz sandstones, locally conglomeratic, deposited in large braided fluvial systems
2) Pre-rift phase - Tithonian - characterized by the mechanical subsidence due to lithosphere thinning that preceded the rift. It is represented by the Brejo Santo Formation, that comprises red shales and claystones, and the Missão Velha Formation, constituted by medium to coarse-grained quartz-feldspathic sandstones, locally conglomeratic, that contains entire trunks and fragments of silicified wood (Dadoxilon benderi) conifer
3) Rift phase - Berriasian to Hauterivian - characterized by increasing mechanical subsidence that created a system of grabens and half grabens. It is represented by the Abaiara Formation, that includes shales, siltstones, sandstones and conglomerates
4) Post-Rift I phase - Aptian to Albian - characterized by thermal subsidence. The lowermost unit Barbalha Formation, represents a fluviolacustrine phase and is composed of red and gray shales, siltstones and claystones.

The Santana Group was formed during this stage and comprises three stratigraphic units:
 Crato Formation that is composed of six intervals of laminated limestones (C1 to C6), interbedded with calciferous siltstones and marls, and is very rich in fossils of vertebrate and invertebrate organisms
 Ipubi Formation, that is mainly composed of organic-rich, black greenish bituminous shales, claystones and algal limestones that are interbedded with gypsum-anhydrite beds
 Romualdo Formation, that represents a calciferous siliciclastic succession composed of fine to medium-grained sandstones, argillaceous siltstones, calciferous shales, and limestones, very rich in fossils. This formation recorded the marine proto-Atlantic incursion that involved the Araripe Basin, and other interior basins and created a large seaway throughout the Borborema Province during the Albian 
5) Post-rift II phase - Albian to Cenomanian - characterized by a major sag phase, and is formed by two stratigraphic units:
 Araripina Formation, that occurs in the western region of the basin and is composed by rhythmites and heterolithic layers of reddish, purplish and yellowish fine-grained sandstone and mudstone
 Exu Formation, that comprises medium-to coarse grained sandstones, fine grained clayey sandstones and local conglomeratic beds

Stratigraphy

See also 

 Chapada do Araripe
 Paraná Basin
 Santos Basin

References

Bibliography

Further reading 
 
 
 
 
 
 
 
 
 
  
 
  
 
 
 
  
 
 
 
  

Drainage basins of Brazil
Sedimentary basins of Brazil
Rift basins
Mesozoic rifts and grabens
Paleontology in Brazil
Geography of Ceará
Geography of Pernambuco
Geography of Piauí